Puerto Rico Highway 183 (PR-183) is a main highway which begins in the downtown/business area of Caguas, near Puerto Rico Highway 1 and ends in Puerto Rico Highway 198 in Las Piedras. Measuring near 25 kilometers, it is real rural parallel road of Puerto Rico Highway 30, though it goes significantly south of the latter (through San Lorenzo) and the only municipality it does not go through which PR-30 does in Humacao. PR-183 can be accessed by two connectors from PR-30; PR-203 from Gurabo to San Lorenzo, and PR-204 (future) in Las Piedras, and they make their only direct intersection in Las Piedras (Exit 21). It is two-lane per direction in Caguas and becomes rural in the municipality just before entering San Lorenzo, and after its confusing intersection with PR-203 it becomes a small two-lane per direction again for about 4 kilometers, and then becomes rural for the rest of its length.

Major intersections

See also

 List of highways numbered 183

References

External links
 

183